The 1994 Topper Open was a men's tennis tournament held in Montevideo, Uruguay and played on outdoor clay courts. The tournament was part of the World Series circuit of the 1994 ATP Tour. It was the inaugural edition of the tournament and was held from 31 October through 6 November 1994. First-seeded Alberto Berasategui won the singles title.

Finals

Singles
 Alberto Berasategui defeated  Francisco Clavet 6–4, 6–0
 It was Berasategui's 7th singles title of the year and the 8th of his career.

Doubles
 Marcelo Filippini /  Luiz Mattar defeated  Sergio Casal /  Emilio Sánchez, 7–6, 6–4

References

External links
 ITF tournament edition details

Topper Open
Topper Open